Robert Tunstall Banks (April 2, 1822 – August 8, 1901) was Mayor of Baltimore from 1867 to 1871.

Early life

Robert Tunstall Banks was born on April 2, 1822, in Williamsburg, Virginia to Charlotte Hayward (née Martin) and George Washington Banks. His father was a lawyer in Virginia and served as a major in the 6th Virginia Regiment. Banks was educated in common schools. After his father death in 1835, Banks was taken into the office of Thomas Ritchie, founder of the Richmond Enquirer. At the age of fifteen, his family moved to Baltimore and he worked as a clerk at a post office there.

Career
Banks was a Democrat. Banks served as Mayor of Baltimore for one term, from November 4, 1867 to November 6, 1871. During his administration, considerable cobblestone street paving happened throughout the city and the first asphalt was laid on South Street. During this period, the Baltimore City Hall construction continued and loans were established for the Valley Road of Virginia and the Western Maryland Railway. The first black people were able to vote during his administration. He was the first mayor elected after the Maryland Constitution of 1867 took effect, changing the term of service to four years. However, the law changed again in 1870, changing the length of service back to two years.

Banks served as register of wills for Baltimore from 1881 to 1892. He was also the founder of a wholesale crockery business called Robert T. Banks & Sons.

Personal life
Banks married Mary B. Loane, of Baltimore, in 1845. She died in December 1899. They had three children: Mrs. Hugh Sutherland, Harry R. and William E.

Banks died on August 8, 1901, at his home at 803 North Calvert Street in Baltimore. He was interred at Green Mount Cemetery in Baltimore.

References

External links

1822 births
1901 deaths
People from Williamsburg, Virginia
Mayors of Baltimore
19th-century American businesspeople
Burials at Green Mount Cemetery